Tacklebox is the 2010 hip hop mixtape by Midwest rap duo The Cool Kids, and their third official mixtape after 2009's Gone Fishing.

Track listing 
Fishing Lessons
Flying Kytes
Freak City
So Neat (Featuring Tennille)
Going Camping
Volume II
Birthdays
Great Outdoors
Strawberry Girl
Systems
Good Afternoon
Parking Lot
Summer Nights (Featuring Tennille)
Los Angeles Leakers Outro
Gettin' Flicked (Featuring Boldy James)

Critical reception 

Sound In The Signals Magazine gave the mixtape a positive review, stating:

"When I listen to this mixtape I do feel that it lacks some things The Bake Sale had, and I miss those things, but in many ways I see new ideas developing and coming to fruition that make this group an undeniable force in hip hop. Nobody wants to hear the same thing twice and if there are hundreds of copycat groups, the best way to combat that is staying creative and I definitely won’t take down a group for experimenting with ideas and trying to create a unique product."

References

External links
http://coolxkids.com/
http://illroots.com/2010/05/31/the-cool-kids-tacklebox/
http://www.prefixmag.com/reviews/the-cool-kids/when-fish-ride-bicycles/25406/
http://pitchfork.com/reviews/albums/14329-tacklebox/

2010 mixtape albums
The Cool Kids albums